Nađa Higl (Serbian Cyrillic: Нађа Хигл; born 2 January 1987) is a Serbian swimmer. She was World Champion in 200 m breaststroke.

Higl was awarded the title "Serbian Sportswoman of the year" for the year 2009 by the Olympic Committee of Serbia and Golden Badge, award for the best athlete of Serbia.

Swimming career 
At the 2009 World Aquatics Championships she won gold medal in the 200 meters breaststroke final on 31 July 2009 with a time of 2:21.62, the new European record. She is the first Serbian woman to become a world champion in swimming.

She competed at the 2008 Summer Olympics in 100 m breaststroke and 200 m breaststroke where she finished in qualification rounds as 43rd and 33rd respectively.  At the 2009 Summer Universiade she won silver medals in 100 m breaststroke and 200 m breaststroke.

Results

Personal life

Nađa's parents are father Dragan and mother Snežana. Her brother Sebastijan is her personal trainer. Higl is married to Milan Boharević and has two children with him. The family moved to Ljubljana in 2021.

See also
 List of swimmers
 List of World Aquatics Championships medalists in swimming (women)
 List of European Short Course Swimming Championships medalists (women)
 List of Serbian records in swimming

References

External links 

 
 
 
 
 

Serbian female swimmers
Female breaststroke swimmers
1987 births
Living people
Serbian people of German descent
World Aquatics Championships medalists in swimming
Olympic swimmers of Serbia
Swimmers at the 2008 Summer Olympics
Swimmers at the 2012 Summer Olympics
Universiade medalists in swimming
Sportspeople from Pančevo
Universiade silver medalists for Serbia
Medalists at the 2009 Summer Universiade
Swimmers at the 2009 Mediterranean Games
Mediterranean Games competitors for Serbia
21st-century Serbian women